Apartment Eight is a 1987 Lower East Side comedy short film by director Matthew Harrison, which won Best Comedy at the 1988 New York Film Festival Downtown and the Mystic Fire Independent Film Award at the 1989 Ann Arbor Film Festival.

Rave-Ups singer Michael Kaniecki (who also wrote the score) and theater director Bob McGrath play former roommates Todd and Martin who, in the early 1980s, briefly led overlapping lives in Apartment Eight. Shot on S8mm film in monthly installments over a one-year period, most of the scenes in Apartment Eight were done as single takes in a cramped Clinton street tenement kitchen, as Todd and Martin re-enact some of the episodes of their downwardly mobile, girlfriend-sharing past.

Cast
Michael Kaniecki as Martin
Bob McGrath as Todd

Festivals and showcases
Apartment Eight was first screened publicly on July 10, 1987, in the East Village at the RAPP arts center by Film Crash. The film was further programmed at Kino Eiszeit Berlin, Space 2B Gas Station, Old and New Masters of Super 8 at the Anthology Film Archives and at the ICA in London.

In early 2005, New York's New Museum of Contemporary Art included Apartment Eight in their exhibit East Village USA. Curatorial Fellow Emily Rothschild wrote "(Apartment Eight's) inclusion is absolutely crucial to a thorough understanding of the East Village scene." and Flavorpill called the film "derelict".

References

External links

1987 films
1980s English-language films
American independent films
1987 comedy films
1987 short films
American comedy short films
Films set in apartment buildings
1987 independent films
1980s American films